Antonio Fernando Prestes Garnero (born 17 August 1983) is a Brazilian road cyclist. He competed in the road race at the 2015 UCI Road World Championships, but did not finish. He also won the Brazilian National Road Race Championships in 2014.

Doping 

In June 2022, Garnero missed the doping control at the cycling amateur event GF Mont Ventoux. He admitted that the missed the control on his own Strava club, stating he didn't know he supposed to be there. He wasn't suspended for the matter. 

In another amateur event shortly after, the stage race Haute Route Alpe d'Huez in July 2022, he was tested positive for the use EPO. The positive test was communicated by the French doping authority AFDL in August, when Garnero was riding the Haute Route Alpes. He confessed the fact straight away on his own Strava account. Haute Route immediately suspended him from the race.  

According to Garnero, he had used the illegal substance because he suffered from "pre-anemic conditions". He also said his drug use was incidental.

Major results
2014
 1st  Road race, National Road Championships
2021
 2nd Road race, National Road Championships

References

External links

1983 births
Living people
Brazilian male cyclists
Brazilian road racing cyclists
Sportspeople from São Paulo